The London Symphony Orchestra (LSO) has been associated with the cinema since the days of silent film. During the 1920s the orchestra played scores arranged and conducted by Eugene Goossens to accompany screenings of The Three Musketeers (1922), The Nibelungs (1924), The Constant Nymph (1927) and The Life of Beethoven (1929).

Since 1935 the LSO has recorded the musical scores of more than 200 films. The orchestra owed its engagement for its first run of soundtrack sessions to Muir Mathieson, musical director of Korda Studios. On the LSO's website, the film specialist Robert Rider calls Mathieson "the most important single figure in the early history of British film music, who enlisted Bliss to write a score for Things to Come, and who was subsequently responsible for bringing the most eminent British 20th-century composers to work for cinema." Mathieson described the LSO as "the perfect film orchestra". Among the composers commissioned by Mathieson for LSO soundtracks were Vaughan Williams, Walton, Britten and Malcolm Arnold and lighter composers including Eric Coates and Noël Coward.

As a pinnacle of Mathieson's collaboration with the LSO, Rider cites the 1946 film Instruments of the Orchestra, a film record of the LSO at work. Malcolm Sargent conducted the orchestra in a performance of Britten's The Young Person's Guide to the Orchestra, composed for the film. Rider adds, "Mathieson's documentary, with its close-ups of the musicians and their instruments, beautifully captures the vibrancy and texture of the Orchestra amidst the optimism of the post-Second World War era."

A later milestone in the LSO's history in film music was in 1977 with the recording of John Williams's score for the first of the nine Star Wars films. Rider comments that this film and its sequels "attracted a new group of admirers and consolidated the period of film music activity for the Orchestra, which continues unabated to this day". The LSO also recorded other Williams film scores, including Superman (1978), Raiders of the Lost Ark (1981), and Harry Potter and the Chamber of Secrets (2002).

List

References
Notes

Sources

Filmography